Falcon–hunter chess (also called Schultz's chess, one-way chess, and meso chess) is a chess variant invented by Karl Schultz in 1943, employing the two fairy chess pieces falcon and hunter. The game takes several forms, including variations hunter chess and decimal falcon–hunter chess added in the 1950s.

Moves of the falcon and hunter
 The falcon moves forward as a chess bishop (on ), and backward as a chess rook (along a ).
 The hunter moves forward as a rook (along a file), and backward as a bishop (on diagonals).

The pieces capture the same as they move.

Falcon–hunter
All the rules and conventions and objective of standard chess apply, including the starting setup. The falcon and hunter start the game off the board and out of play (see diagram). Once a player loses (or exchanges) their queen, a rook, a bishop, or a knight, they may, on any subsequent move, enter their falcon or hunter into play on any empty square of their . Doing so constitutes a turn. The player becomes eligible to enter their remaining fairy piece (falcon or hunter) after losing a second piece (queen, rook, bishop, or knight). A move entering the falcon or hunter into play may also give check.

Variations
 In one variation, the falcon and hunter are introduced only through pawn promotion: a pawn promotes only to falcon or hunter.
 In another variation, the starting setup is without queens, and each player's king starts on a new square added to the end of the e-file (the chessboard having a total of 66 squares). The hunter starts on the square normally reserved for the queen; the falcon starts on the square normally reserved for the king. A pawn may promote to any piece, including queen, falcon, or hunter.
 Falcon–hunter chess was renamed hunter chess in the 1950s, with rule addition that either a queen or king may castle using a hunter.

Decimal falcon–hunter

Decimal falcon–hunter chess (also known as great one-way chess), invented in the 1950s, is played on a 10×10 board with the falcon and hunter already in the starting setup (see diagram). All the standard chess rules and conventions apply, with the following differences:
 On its first move, a pawn may advance 1, 2, or 3 steps. There is no en passant.
 On its first move, a knight has the option to move or capture by leaping in a (2,4) pattern (i.e. two steps as a nightrider, where the square corresponding to the first step is jumped).

References

Bibliography

External links
 Falcon-Hunter Chess a simple program by Ed Friedlander (Java)

Chess variants
Fairy chess
1943 in chess
Board games introduced in 1943